General elections were held in Aruba on 25 June 2021 to elect all 21 members of Parliament. The elections were originally scheduled to take place in September 2021, but were brought forward following the resignation of the government after a criminal investigation was opened against one of the governing coalition parties, Proud and Respected People, for embezzling government money.

Electoral system
The 21 members were elected via open list proportional representation.

Results

References

2021 elections in the Caribbean
2021 in Aruba
Elections in Aruba